Lateral intermuscular septum may refer to:
 lateral intermuscular septum of arm
 lateral intermuscular septum of thigh